Namaksin is a kind of traditional Korean clog made of wood for protection against mud and rain. Namaksin are known as close-toed shoes made of one piece of wood. There was a misconception that these traditional clogs came not from Asia but from the Netherlands in the past, but in reality, there had been clogs at least from Three Kingdoms period of Korea, which were similar to geta, Japanese clogs. Those old namaksin were called "pyeonggeuk (平屐)". It is presumed that clogs of Baekje went to Japan, and it became the origin of geta. Clogs in Baekje had three holes like geta, but clogs in Silla had five holes. How people tied its strings in that era is unclear. In the Three Kingdoms period, there were two types of clogs: open-toes shoes, and close-toes shoes. As time went by, the latter became primary as namaksin. These shoes were worn by Koreans of all ages and social positions, usually in the rainy seasons.

References

 인병선 "한 · 중 · 일 삼국의 고대 나막신 연구" 문화재  38 pp. 109–128 (2005) : 109. UCI G704-SER000010438.2005..38.003
 An Illustrated Guide to Korean Culture - 233 traditional key words. Seoul: Hakgojae Publishing Co. 2002. pp. 138–139.  
 "Culture." EPIK. N.p., n.d. Web. 20 September 2013.
 "Dutch clogs." The Hutchinson Encyclopedia. Abington: Helicon, 2013. Credo Reference. Web. 29 September 2013.
 DeMello, Margo. Feet and Footwear: A Cultural Encyclopedia. Santa Barbara, CA: Greenwood/ABC-CLIO, 2009. Print.

Clogs (shoes)
Korean footwear
Medieval costume